Bald Knob High School is a comprehensive public high school for students in grades 9 through 12 located in Bald Knob, Arkansas, United States. The school serves more than 412 students in White County.

Academics 
The assumed course of study follows the Smart Core curriculum developed by the Arkansas Department of Education (ADE), which requires students complete at least 22 units prior to graduation. Students complete regular coursework and exams and may take Advanced Placement (AP) courses and exam with the opportunity to receive college credit.

In 2012, Bald Knob High School had rankings of No. 1,800 (national rank) and No. 16 (state rank) in the Best High Schools Report developed by U.S. News & World Report.

Athletics 
The Bald Knob High School athletic emblem (mascot) is the Bulldog with blue and white serving as the school colors.

The Bald Knob Bulldogs compete in interscholastic activities within the 3A Classification administered by the Arkansas Activities Association. The Bulldogs play within the 3A Region 2 Conference and field varsity teams in football, golf (boys/girls), basketball (boys/girls), cross country (boys/girls), cheer, bowling (boys/girls), baseball, fastpitch softball, and track and field (boys/girls).

Notable alumni 
 Jason Jennings (1997)—Professional basketball player.

References

External links

 

Public high schools in Arkansas
Schools in White County, Arkansas